The Whitefish River is a river in the James Bay and Moose River drainage basins in Cochrane and Timiskaming Districts in northeastern Ontario, Canada. It flows  from Mount Sinclair Lake to its mouth at Night Hawk Lake, the source of the Frederick House River, a tributary of the Abitibi River.

Course
It heads north and takes in the left tributary Little Whitefish River arriving from Little Whitefish Lake. The river jogs southeast and northeast, then heads north and takes in the right tributary East Whitefish River.

Tributaries
McLeod Creek (left)
Radisson Creek (right)
Brush Creek (right)
East Whitefish River (right)
Argyle Creek (right)
McCollum Creek (left)
Bannockburn Creek (right)
Little Whitefish River (left)

See also
List of rivers of Ontario

References

Rivers of Cochrane District
Rivers of Timiskaming District